NTEC or NTec may refer to:
 National Technical Education Certificate, Bruneian vocational qualification
 Northern Territory Electoral Commission, Australian electoral commission